Edward Matthew McEntee (October 21, 1906 – February 14, 1981) was a United States circuit judge of the United States Court of Appeals for the First Circuit.

Education and career

Born in Providence, Rhode Island, McEntee received an Artium Baccalaureus degree from the College of the Holy Cross in 1928. He received a Bachelor of Laws from Boston University School of Law in 1933. He was in private practice of law in Providence from 1933 to 1952. He was a Member of the Rhode Island House of Representatives from 1935 to 1939. He was an Assistant United States Attorney of the District of Rhode Island from 1940 to 1951. He was the United States Attorney for the District of Rhode Island from 1952 to 1953.

Federal judicial service

McEntee was nominated by President Lyndon B. Johnson on August 3, 1965, to a seat on the United States Court of Appeals for the First Circuit vacated by Judge Peter Woodbury. He was confirmed by the United States Senate on August 31, 1965, and received his commission on September 1, 1965. He assumed senior status on December 31, 1976. His service was terminated on February 14, 1981, due to his death.

References

Sources
 

1906 births
1981 deaths
Boston University School of Law alumni
College of the Holy Cross alumni
Members of the Rhode Island House of Representatives
United States Attorneys for the District of Rhode Island
Judges of the United States Court of Appeals for the First Circuit
United States court of appeals judges appointed by Lyndon B. Johnson
20th-century American judges
20th-century American lawyers
Assistant United States Attorneys
20th-century American politicians